Walter Zürrer may refer to:
 Walter Zürrer (footballer, born 1916), Swiss footballer for FC Basel
 Walter Zürrer (footballer, born 1879), Swiss footballer for FC Basel